The 2015–16 LEN Euro Cup was the second tier of European competition in water polo. It ran from 30 September 2015 to 30 April 2016.

Overview

Team allocation

Round and draw dates
The schedule of the competition was as follows.

Qualifying rounds

Qualification round I
Thirteen teams took part in the first qualifying round. They were drawn into one group of six and one group of seven teams, who played on 30 September−4 October 2015. The top four teams of each group advanced to the next round.

Group A
Tournament played in Budapest, Hungary.

Group B
Tournament played in Split, Croatia.

Qualification round II
Eight teams took part in the second qualifying round. They were drawn into two groups of four teams, which played on 16−18 October 2015. The top two teams of each group advanced to the quarterfinals.

Group C
Tournament was played in Naples, Italy.

Group D
Tournament was played in Split, Croatia.

Knockout stage

Bracket

Quarter-finals

These teams played against each other over two legs on a home-and-away basis. The mechanism of the draws for each round was as follow:
In the draw for the quarter finals, the four group winners were seeded, and the four group runners-up were unseeded. The seeded teams were drawn against the unseeded teams, with the seeded teams hosting the second leg. Teams from the same association could not be drawn against each other.
The first legs were played on 11 November, and the second legs were played on 16 December 2015.

|}

Semi-finals
The first legs were played on 3 February, and the second legs were played on 10 February 2016.

|}

Final
The first leg were played on 16 April, and the second leg were played on 30 April 2016.

|}

See also
2015–16 LEN Champions League

References

LEN Euro Cup seasons
Euro Cup
2015 in water polo
2016 in water polo